Mohopada, alias Wasambe, is a census town in Raigad district in the Indian state of Maharashtra.

Demographics
 India census, Mohpada Alias Wasambe had a population of 8735. Males constitute 54% of the population and females 46%. Mohpada Alias Wasambe has an average literacy rate of 76%, higher than the national average of 59.5%: male literacy is 80%, and female literacy is 71%. In Mohpada, 16% of the population is under 6 years of age.

References

Cities and towns in Raigad district